The 2020 CAF Women's Olympic Qualifying Tournament was the fifth edition of the CAF Women's Olympic Qualifying Tournament, the quadrennial international football competition organised by the Confederation of African Football (CAF) to determine which women's national teams from Africa qualify for the Olympic football tournament.

CAF was given 1.5 places for the 2020 Summer Olympics women's football tournament in Japan. The winner of the qualifying tournament, Zambia, qualified directly, while runner-up Cameroon entered a play-off against the second-placed team from CONMEBOL, Chile.

Teams
The 54 members of CAF were eligible to enter the qualifying competition, and a total of 25 national teams were in the qualifying draw, which was announced on 22 February 2019. The seven teams which had the best performance in the qualifying competition for the 2016 Olympics were given a bye to the second round.

Equatorial Guinea were banned by FIFA from qualifying for the 2020 Summer Olympics. However, they were still entered in the qualifying competition.

Notes
Teams in bold qualified for the Olympics.
(D): Disqualified after draw
(W): Withdrew after draw

Did not enter

Format
Qualification ties are played on a home-and-away two-legged basis. If the aggregate score is tied after the second leg, the away goals rule is applied, and if still level, extra time is played. The away goals rule is again applied after extra time, and if still level, the penalty shoot-out is used to determine the winner.

Schedule
The schedule of the qualifying rounds is as follows. All matches are played during the FIFA International Window.

Bracket

First round

|}

Ivory Coast won on walkover due to FIFA's suspension of the Sierra Leone Football Association.

Mali won 5–3 on aggregate.

Algeria won 3–1 on aggregate.

Ethiopia won 4–2 on aggregate.

DR Congo won 3–2 on aggregate.

2–2 on aggregate. Gabon won 5–3 on penalties.

Malawi won 14–1 on aggregate.

Zambia won on walkover after Angola withdrew.

Botswana won 3–2 on aggregate.

Second round

|}

Ivory Coast won 3–0 on aggregate.

Nigeria won 3–0 on aggregate.

1–1 on aggregate. Cameroon won on away goals.

DR Congo won on walkover after Equatorial Guinea withdrew.

Ghana won 5–0 on aggregate.

Kenya won 5–3 on aggregate.

Zambia won on walkover after Zimbabwe failed to arrive for the second leg.

0–0 on aggregate. Botswana won 3–2 on penalties.

Third round

|}

1–1 on aggregate. Ivory Coast won on away goals.

Cameroon won 3–2 on aggregate.

Kenya won 1–0 on aggregate.

Zambia won 3–0 on aggregate.

Fourth round

|}

Cameroon won 2–1 on aggregate.

Zambia won 3–2 on aggregate.

Fifth round
The winner qualified for the 2020 Summer Olympics, while the loser entered a play-off against a team from CONMEBOL.

|}

4–4 on aggregate. Zambia won on away goals.

Qualified teams for Summer Olympics
The following team from CAF qualified for the 2020 Summer Olympic women's football tournament. Cameroon failed to qualify after they lost the play-off against the 2018 Copa América Femenina second-placed team, Chile.

2 Bold indicates champions for that year. Italic indicates hosts for that year.

Goalscorers

Notes

References

External links
WOMEN’S OLYMPICS, CAFonline.com

2020
Football at the 2020 Summer Olympics – Women's qualification
Women's Olympic Qualifying Tournament
2019 in women's association football
Women's Olympic Qualifying Tournament
2020 in women's association football
April 2019 sports events in Africa
August 2019 sports events in Africa
September 2019 sports events in Africa
October 2019 sports events in Africa
November 2019 sports events in Africa
March 2020 sports events in Africa